Sumayyah bint Khabbāṭ or Sumayyah bint Khayyāṭ (c. 550 – 615 CE / 72 BH – 7 BH), was the mother of Ammar ibn Yasir and first member of the Ummah (Community) of the Islamic prophet Muhammad  to become a shahidah (female martyr).

Early life
She was a slave in the possession of Abu Hudhaifah ibn al-Mughirah, a member of the Makhzum clan in Mecca. Her master gave her in marriage to Yasir ibn Amir, who was from the Malik clan of the Madh'hij tribe in Yemen. After coming to Mecca to look for a lost brother, he had decided to settle there under Abu Hudhayfa's protection. Sumayyah gave birth to their son Ammar c.566. Yasir also had two brothers, Hurth and Abdullah, 

At a later date, Abu Hudhayfa freed both Sumayyah and her son Ammar; but they remained his clients for the rest of his life. It is said that Abu Hudhayfa died "before Islam"; but it is also said that he was "one of those who mocked the Prophet".

Conversion to Islam
According to one tradition, Sumayyah was one of the first seven "to display Islam," the other six being Muhammad, Abu Bakr, Bilal, Khabbab, Suhayb and her son Ammar. "To display Islam" might refer to something other than conversion since, according to another tradition, Ammar was not converted until after the Muslims had entered the house of al-Arqam "after thirty men". Yasir and his son Abdullah were also converted "on the rise of Islam," but Hurth had been killed by the Dil clan before 610.

The Quraysh persecuted Muslims of low social rank. Sumayyah's family was vulnerable after the death of their patron, and it was other members of the Makhzum clan who tortured them to pressure them to abandon their faith. On one occasion she was put inside a pitcher full of water and lifted so that she could not escape. She, Yasir and Ammar were also forced to stand in the sun in the heat of the day dressed in mail-coats. 

Although described as "a very old and frail woman," Sumayyah remained steadfast and refused to abandon Islam.

Death
One evening Abu Jahl, also a member of the Makhzum clan, came to watch her standing there and he began to insult her verbally. Then he killed her by stabbing and impaling her with his spear.When Abu Jahl was killed at Badr, Muhammad said to Ammar, "Allah has killed your mother's killer."

Tabari mentions an alternative account of Sumayyah's life. He says she married a Byzantine slave named Azraq after Yasir's death. She bore him a son named Salamah and their bloodline eventually married into the Umayyad family. Tabari also notes some stories as a case of possible confusion between two Meccan women named Sumayyah.

Historical references
The earliest reference to the murder of Sumayyah is found in Ibn Ishaq's (died 761) biography of Muhammad, Siratu Rasulullah ("Biography of the Messenger of God"). Her name Sumayyah is not explicitly mentioned in Ibn Ishaq; it is a deduction from the reference to her son as Ammar "son of" Sumayya. However, she is named as Sumayyah in the accounts of Ibn Saad and Tabari.

See also
 Khadija bint Khuwaylid
 Halimah bint Abi Dhuayb
 Islamic perspective on the first martyr of mankind
 The martyrs of al-Ukhdud ("the Ditch", or a place near Najran)

References

Women companions of the Prophet
Sahabah martyrs
550s births
615 deaths
Non-Arab companions of the Prophet